Arnače is a village in the Municipality of Velenje in northern Slovenia. It lies in the Ložnica Hills south of the town of Velenje. The area is part of the traditional region of Styria. The entire municipality is now included in the Savinja Statistical Region.

The parish church in the settlement is dedicated to Saint Giles and belongs to the Roman Catholic Archdiocese of Maribor. It was first mentioned in written documents dating to 1365. Parts of the church were rebuilt in the mid 17th century and the early 18th century.

References

External links

Arnače at Geopedia

Populated places in the City Municipality of Velenje